Deolinda is a common Portuguese and Spanish name and surname and may also refer to:

Religious figures
Deolinda Correa, died in the civil war in 1840 of Argentina, and is a semi-pagan mythical figure in folk-religion of Argentina and Chile

Culture
Deolinda,  a Portuguese quartet band
Deolinda da Conceição (1914–1957),  teacher, writer, translator and journalist of Macau